The R309 is a Regional Route in South Africa that connects Postmasburg with the R64 between Groblershoop and Griekwastad.

References

External links
 Routes Travel Info

Regional Routes in the Northern Cape